Surendra Kumar Jain is the international Joint General Secretary of Vishwa Hindu Parishad (VHP). He has retired from Principal, Hindu College Rohtak (Haryana) in India in 2013. He was the third president (national convener) of the Bajrang Dal after Vinay Katiyar and Jaibhan Singh Pawaiya. He was succeeded as president of Bajrang Dal by Prakash Sharma on 12 June 2002. He graduated from the Shri Ram College of commerce in New Delhi and obtained a post graduate degree from the Delhi School of Economics.

References

Bharatiya Janata Party politicians from Haryana
Delhi School of Economics alumni
Living people
Shri Ram College of Commerce alumni
1954 births